The Edgar-class ships of the line were a class of three 60-gun fourth rates, designed for the Royal Navy by Sir Thomas Slade.

Ships

Builder: Martin and Henniker, Chatham
Ordered: 7 May 1756
Launched: 22 June 1758
Fate: Broken up, 1813

Builder: Randall, Rotherhithe
Ordered: 19 April 1756
Launched: 16 November 1758
Fate: Sunk as a breakwater, 1774

Builder: Perry, Blackwall Yard
Ordered: 11 August 1756
Launched: 15 January 1759
Fate: Sold out of the service, 1791

References

Lavery, Brian (2003) The Ship of the Line – Volume 1: The development of the battlefleet 1650–1850. Conway Maritime Press. .

 
Ship of the line classes